Symenko Jochinke (born 12 July 1974) is a former Australian racing cyclist. She won the Australian national road race title in 1997.

References

External links
 

1974 births
Living people
Australian female cyclists
Place of birth missing (living people)
20th-century Australian women
21st-century Australian women